Comedy Now! is a Canadian comedy television series which debuted in 1997 and ended in 2014 featuring the newest in Canadian comedic talent. The show has won numerous Gemini Awards as well as many international awards. It is broadcast in Canada on The Comedy Network and CTV. In the United States, the program airs on Comedy Central.

The show has started the careers of notable Canadian comedians, including Brent Butt, Gavin Crawford, Shaun Majumder, Russell Peters, Pete Zedlacher and Harland Williams and has showcased comedians such as Trent McClellan, Darcy Michael, Graham Chittenden and Eric Tunney.

Most episodes of the series featured a single comedian performing a stand-up set, although a few highlighted sketch comedy troupes and a number of "gala" episodes featuring several comedians were also aired as specials. These included Women of the Night, a "women in comedy" special which aired in 2001 with Brigitte Gall, Aurora Browne, Jen Goodhue, Sabrina Jalees, Diana Love and Renee Percy. This episode garnered a Gemini Award nomination for Best Comedy Program at the 17th Gemini Awards in 2002.

Performers

Solo performers

Sketch troupes and specials
The Bobroom
Bowser & Blue
The Doo-Wops: John Catucci, David Mesiano
Not Getting It: Adrian Churchill, Terry McGurrin, Anne Marie Scheffler
Not to Be Repeated: Ed Sahely, Kathy Greenwood, Jonathan Wilson
Skippy's Rangers: Jonathan Crombie, Lisa Lambert, Bob Martin, Paul O'Sullivan
Women of the Night: Brigitte Gall, Aurora Browne, Jen Goodhue, Sabrina Jalees, Diana Love, Renee Percy
Women of the Night, Pt. 2: Aurora Browne, Renee Percy

Awards
Several comedians who appeared on the series received Gemini Award nominations or wins for Best Performance in a Comedy Series, Individual or Ensemble (1997-1999) or Individual Performance in a Comedy Series (2000-2010):

 John Rogers — 12th Gemini Awards (Spring 1998)
 Brent Butt — 13th Gemini Awards (Fall 1998)
 Shaun Majumder — 14th Gemini Awards (1999)
 Gavin Crawford — 15th Gemini Awards (2000)
 Harland Williams — 15th Gemini Awards (2000)
  Jason Rouse — 16th Gemini Awards (2001)
 Glen Foster — 16th Gemini Awards (2001)
 Jessica Holmes — 16th Gemini Awards (2001)
 Nikki Payne — 18th Gemini Awards (2003)
 Russell Peters — 19th Gemini Awards (2004)
 Levi MacDougall — 20th Gemini Awards (2005)
 Terry McGurrin — 24th Gemini Awards (2009)

Greg Malone's special, Pocket Queen, won an award at the 1999 WorldFest-Houston International Film Festival.

References

External links 

 
 Comedy Now! at CTV Television Network
 
 

CTV Television Network original programming
CTV 2 original programming
Canadian Screen Award-winning television shows
1997 Canadian television series debuts
CTV Comedy Channel original programming
1990s Canadian comedy television series
Television series by Bell Media
Canadian stand-up comedy television series